Lugano FLP railway station is a railway station in the municipality of Lugano, in the Swiss canton of Ticino. It is the eastern terminus of the  gauge Lugano–Ponte Tresa line of Ferrovie Luganesi. The station is located in the forecourt of Swiss Federal Railways' main-line Lugano railway station.

The station and line opened in 1912. Between 1990 and 1992 the Lugano FLP station was renovated and expanded. The street level building is now a restaurant, although the platforms remain in use at the lower level.

Services 
 the following services stop at Lugano FLP:

References

External links 
 
 

Railway stations in Ticino
Transport in Lugano
Ferrovie Luganesi stations
Railway stations in Switzerland opened in 1912